Nicolas Perelle (1631–1695) was a French painter and engraver.

Son of Gabriel Perelle and older brother to Adam Perelle, he was the author of some of the prints of the Louis the Great's conquests.

References

External links

Veües des plus beaux lieux de France et d'Italie : Digitized album containing 283 prints (Princeton University Digital Library)

1631 births
1695 deaths
French painters
Engravers from Paris
Artists from Paris